Vyacheslav Tereshchenko (born 16 January 1977 in Odessa, Ukraine) is a former Ukrainian football forward.

References

External links
 
 

1977 births
Living people
Footballers from Odesa
Ukrainian footballers
FC Chornomorets Odesa players
FC Chornomorets-2 Odesa players
FC Dynamo Odesa players
SC Odesa players
FC Dnister Ovidiopol players
FC SKA-Lotto Odesa players
FC Portovyk Illichivsk players
PFC Belasitsa Petrich players
FC Obolon-Brovar Kyiv players
FC Hoverla Uzhhorod players
FC Ivan Odesa players
Ukrainian Premier League players
Ukrainian expatriate footballers
Expatriate footballers in Bulgaria
Ukrainian Cup top scorers
Ukrainian football managers
Association football forwards